Patricia Molly Owens (January 17, 1925 – August 31, 2000) was a Canadian-born American actress, working in Hollywood. She appeared in about 40 films and 10 television episodes in a career lasting from 1943 to 1968.

Early work
Owens moved to England in 1933 with her parents (her Welsh father Arthur Owens was later to become an MI5 double agent), and 10 years later, at age 18, she made her motion-picture debut in the musical comedy Miss London Ltd. The following year, she had a small role in Harold French's social satire English Without Tears. Her career continued in this manner for a few years, Owens getting ever-larger roles in movies.

Her career received a boost when she was seen by a 20th Century Fox executive while performing in a stage production of Sabrina Fair, and was offered a screen test. The result was a contract with the studio and a move to Hollywood. Her first American film was Island in the Sun (1957), followed by No Down Payment, both for Fox, after which Owens was lent to Warner Bros. to appear in the critically acclaimed drama Sayonara (1957).

Success in The Fly
Owens spent the rest of 1957 working mostly on loan, but a successful Fox production  secured her best known role, as Hélène Delambre, the wife of scientist André Delambre in The Fly (1958). Owens carried much of that horror film's narrative, which was largely presented in flashback from her character's point of view.

None of Owens' subsequent films ever attained the same level of success as The Fly. She co-starred in the 1960 war film Hell to Eternity, then in 1961 appeared in the threadbare, backlot POW/jungle chase drama Seven Women from Hell. Owens made occasional television appearances, on series such as Perry Mason and Burke's Law, but these were relatively infrequent. Owens starred in the 1959 episode "The Crystal Trench" of the series Alfred Hitchcock Presents. She was also in an episode of Tales of Wells Fargo titled "Assignment In Gloribee" in 1962. She plays an uptight, cynical Bostonian who is sent out west to write a "favorable" review of the west, on behalf of Wells Fargo.

In 1964, she gave a fine performance as a cold blooded beautiful, yet murderous woman, who uses men to her satisfaction in the S9E32 episode “Scott Free” on the TV Western series Gunsmoke.

Retirement
By 1965, Owens was working in Black Spurs, a B-Western produced by A.C. Lyles, who was renowned for using older stars in that genre. She retired from feature films in 1968 after portraying the love interest in the low-budget espionage thriller The Destructors. Later that same year, she made her last professional appearance in a televised episode of Lassie.

Personal life
Owens was married and divorced three times. Her first husband, producer and screenwriter Sy Bartlett, and she wed in 1956 and remained together for two years. She next married Jerome Nathanson in 1960, and they had one child before their divorce in 1961. Her third marriage was to John Austin from 1969 until their divorce in 1975.

Partial filmography

 Miss London Ltd. (1943) - Miss London (uncredited)
 English Without Tears (1944) - Girl Getting Autograph (uncredited)
 Give Us the Moon (1944) - Chambermaid (uncredited)
 One Exciting Night (1944) - Minor Role (uncredited)
 While the Sun Shines (1947) - Minor Role (uncredited)
 Things Happen at Night (1948)
 Panic at Madame Tussaud's (1948) - Phyllis Edwards
 Paper Orchid (1949) - Mary MacSweeney
 Bait (1950) - Anna Hastings
 The Happiest Days of Your Life (1950) - Angela Parry
 Old Mother Riley, Headmistress (1950) - Girl
 Mystery Junction (1951) - Mabel Dawn
 Crow Hollow (1952) - Willow
 Ghost Ship (1952) - Joyce - Party Girl
 House of Blackmail (1953) - Joan
 Knights of the Round Table (1953) - Lady Vivien (uncredited)
 The Good Die Young (1954) - Winnie (uncredited)
 A Stranger Came Home (1954) - Blonde
 Tale of Three Women (1954) - Mary (segment "Final Twist' story)
 Windfall (1955) - Connie Lee
 Colonel March Investigates (1955, TV Series) - Betty Hartley
 Alive on Saturday (1957) - Sally Parker
 Island in the Sun (1957) - Sylvia Fleury
 No Down Payment (1957) - Jean Martin
 Sayonara (1957) - Eileen Webster
 The Law and Jake Wade (1958) - Peggy
 The Fly (1958) - Helene Delambre
 The Gun Runners (1958) - Lucy Martin
 These Thousand Hills (1959) - Joyce
 Five Gates to Hell (1959) - Joy
 Hell to Eternity (1960) - Sheila Lincoln
 Seven Women from Hell (1961) - Grace Ingram
 X-15 (1961) - Margaret Brandon
 Gunfight in Black Horse Canyon (1961, TV Movie) - Katherine (archive footage)
 The Untouchables (1963, Episode: "The Charlie Argos Story") - Marcy Devon
 Walk a Tightrope (1964) - Ellen Sheppard
 Black Spurs (1965) - Clare Grubbs
 The Destructors (1968) - Charlie

References

External links
 
 
 

1925 births
2000 deaths
Actresses from British Columbia
Canadian expatriates in the United Kingdom
Canadian people of Welsh descent
People from the Columbia-Shuswap Regional District
Canadian emigrants to the United States
Canadian film actresses
Canadian television actresses
20th-century Canadian actresses